The Boardman River, also known as the Ottaway River or the Boardman–Ottaway River, is a  river in the northwestern Lower Peninsula of Michigan. It rises in western Kalkaska County, and flows west and north through Grand Traverse County to end in downtown Traverse City at the Grand Traverse Bay, a bay of Lake Michigan. The river's watershed drains an area of  through a combined  of river and tributaries. Additionally, the Boardman River is considered one of the top ten trout streams in Michigan.

History 

Prior to European settlement, the river was known as adaawewiziibi, roughly translating from Ojibwe as "river of trade".

In the year 1847, Captain Horace Boardman of Naperville, Illinois, purchased land at the head of Grand Traverse Bay, at a river then known as the Ottaway River. With the arrival of Hannah-Lay in the 1850s, the river was colloquially, and later officially, renamed the Boardman River. Recent movements have sought to change the name of the river to its original name, either in full or abbreviated (i.e. Boardman–Ottaway River)

Later in 1800s, as Traverse City was first being settled, the Union Street Dam was being built by the Hannah-Lay Company as a saw mill. Around this time, citizens were dumping sewage into the Boardman, which was causing severe health problems. The lake became very industrialized. The western shore of the lake was used for a log rollaway and rail yard on the Great Lakes Central Railroad, up until the early 2000s. Additionally, five dams were built along the main course of the river.

Course 
The Boardman River has a rather unusually-shaped path. The river rises from streams in western Kalkaska County, east of US 131. The flow is generally west–southwest to west until reaching Blair Township, where the course turns due north. Upon exiting Boardman Lake, water flows west, before turning back due east, forming a U-shape around downtown Traverse City. The river then angles northeast where it enters the west arm of Grand Traverse Bay.

Boardman Lake is a body of water on the mainstream Boardman River, about a mile upstream from Grand Traverse Bay, and adjacent to Traverse City. The lake grew in size, by about 30%, in 1894, with the completion of the Union Street Dam in Traverse City.

This lake is also a popular recreational and fishing lake. It has an abundance of bluegill, largemouth bass, northern pike, smallmouth bass, sunfish, walleye, and yellow perch.

Restoration 
Five dams were built along the main course of the Boardman River, in upstream order: the Union Street Dam, Sabin Dam, Boardman Dam, Keystone Dam, and Brown Bridge Dam. In 1961, the Keystone Dam was washed out after flooding upstream. On October 6, 2012, while preparing to demolish Brown Bridge Dam, the highest on the river and largest in terms of impoundment, a temporary structure put in place to facilitate drawdown at the dam was breached, flooding the river valley. In June 2014 the Michigan DEQ issued a report identifying erosion around the temporary drawdown structure as the likely cause of the failure. Brown Bridge Dam removal was completed in January 2013 and resulted in the reestablishment of 2.5 miles of river channel.

In 2017, Boardman Dam and its impoundment structure were demolished, along with an adjacent one-lane bridge carrying Cass Road over the river. A new bridge for Cass Road over the new future river channel was completed the previous year. With the removal of this dam, the watercourse was realigned under the new bridge for the first time.

Sabin Dam was fully removed by the end of 2018. This leaves Union Street Dam as the only remaining impoundment on the main course of the Boardman River. Recently, proposals to reconstruct the Union Street Dam to allow for a more fish-friendly configuration have been proposed by the city of Traverse City.

Bridges 
The following road bridges lay on the main course of the river, entirely within Grand Traverse County.

Drainage basin 
The Boardman River drains the following municipalities (italicized municipalities are those which the river drains but does not flow through):
 Grand Traverse County
 Blair Township
 East Bay Township
 Fife Lake Township
 Garfield Township
 Green Lake Township
 Long Lake Township
 Mayfield Township
 Paradise Township
 Traverse City
 Union Township
 Whitewater Township
 Kalkaska County
 Boardman Township
 Coldsprings Township
 Excelsior Township
 Garfield Township
 Kalkaska
 Kalkaska Township
 Orange Township
 Rapid River Township
 Springfield Township
The Boardman River is also drains the following lakes:

 Arbutus Lake
 Bass Lake
 Rennie Lake
 Silver Lake
 Spider Lake

See also 

 Manistee River, whose watershed drains land east and south of Boardman River's watershed.
 List of rivers of Michigan

References

External links 
 The Boardman - A River Reborn

Northern Michigan
Rivers of Michigan
Rivers of Grand Traverse County, Michigan
Rivers of Kalkaska County, Michigan
Geography of Grand Traverse County, Michigan
Geography of Kalkaska County, Michigan
Tributaries of Lake Michigan